Sherpur Government Victoria Academy is a boys' secondary school in Sherpur Sadar Upazila, Sherpur District, Bangladesh, founded in 1887.

History
The school was founded on 1 April 1887 in honor of the 25th anniversary of the coronation of Queen Victoria.  At the time it was called Sherpur Victoria Memorial Academy.

Until 1960 (after the partition of India in 1947), the school was run under the authority of the University of Calcutta.  In 1981 it was nationalised and renamed Sherpur Government Victoria Academy.

The School has already passed its 125-year anniversary. On 30–31 January 2013 the "125 Year Anniversary" was celebrated by the former and current students. Advocate Abdul Hamid (Speaker of parliament) was present.

References

 Boys' schools in Bangladesh
 High schools in Bangladesh
1887 establishments in India
 Educational institutions established in 1887